Shiner is a common name used in North America for any of several kinds of small, usually silvery fish, in particular a number of cyprinids, but also e.g. the shiner perch (Cymatogaster aggregata).

Cyprinid shiners are:
 Eastern shiners, genus Notropis
 Finescale shiners, genus Lythrurus
 Flagfin shiners, genus Pteronotropis
 Golden shiner, Notemigonus crysoleucas (a monotypic genus)
 Highscale shiners, genus Luxilus
 Redside shiners, genus Richardsonius
 Satinfin shiners, genus Cyprinella

See also
 Chub (disambiguation)
 Dace (disambiguation)
 Minnow
 Roach (disambiguation)

Leuciscinae
Fish common names